Ferenc Veress  (1 September 1832, Kolozsvár - 3 April 1916, Kolozsvár) was a Hungarian photographer and inventor.

Biography 
He became involved in photography through Baron , an amateur daguerreotypist, whose wife was related to wife. His first solo album featured portraits of notable Transylvanian people.

In 1852, he opened his own studio in Kolozsvár. It soon became a gathering place for members of the local creative community; such as the writer, Mór Jókai, the painter, Mihály Munkácsy, the scholar, Sámuel Brassai and the poet, . In 1858, he opened a joint art and photography studio with his friend, the painter György Vastagh.

He wrote an article in 1862, for the magazine Ország Tükre (roughly: "Reflections on the Nation"), suggesting that daguerreotypes should be preserved in museums. In 1880, the first photography exhibition took place at the Hall of Art, Budapest. The following year, he became a lecturer in photography at the local university. He began publishing a magazine in 1882, Fényképészeti Lapok (Photographic Journal), with financial support from his old mentor, Baron Apor. It was published until 1888. 

By 1890, he was in financial trouble and was forced to rent part of his studio. Five years later, he made an appeal to what were then over 400 photographers in Hungary; to capture the landscapes, buildings and famous people of their country and establish a single, national collection. He attempted to enlist the help of the railways in providing free transportation for the project, but was unsuccessful, and the photographic societies remained indifferent, so he proposed setting up a "Photographers' Cooperative". 

By 1897, he had given up his studio entirely, although he continued the experiments with color that he had been conducting since 1881. His last known photographs date from 1911. His son, became a well known painter.

Selected photographs

Sources 
 Kincses Károly: Levétetett Veressnél, Kolozsvárt (Taken by Veress, exhibition catalog), Magyar Fotográfiai Múzeum, 1993
 Sas Péter: A Szamos-parti Athén, A 19. századi Kolozsvár és lakói Veress Ferenc felvételein (Athens on the Szamos River, 19th Century Cluj-Napoca and Its Residents by Ferenc Veress), Kolozsvár, Művelődés, 2003  
 Sas Péter: A 19. századi Kolozsvár és lakói Veress Ferenc felvételein (The 19th century in the recordings of Cluj-Napoca and its inhabitants by Ferenc Veress), Művelődés Kolozsvár. 2003 
 Egy egyszerű, boldog leányka napjaiból: Veress Piroska naplói ("From the days of a simple, happy girl": Piroska Veress' Diaries), Sas Péter (Ed.), Kolozsvár, Művelődés Egyesület; Szentimrei Alapítvány, 2016

External links 

 Fényképészeti lapok (Photographic Journal) @ the Biblioteca Digitala BCU Cluj
 Biographical notes @ the Hungarian Electronic Library

1832 births
1916 deaths
Hungarian photographers
Transylvanian Hungarians
Photographic studios
People from Cluj-Napoca